John William Bolts (1861 - 1921) was a state legislator in South Carolina. He was elected in 1898 and 1900 from Georgetown, South Carolina and served in the South Carolina House of Representatives. Bolts was the last African American to serve in the South Carolina House of Representatives for seven decades that followed.

Bolts succeeded Robert B. Anderson as the African American representative for the Georgetown County fusion ticket.

He was married to Gertrude Ford Bolts and had four children. He studied at Benedict College.

References

Further reading
"For We are Making History": John W. Bolts and Archival Memory in South Carolina", Valerie McLaurin (2020). International Gullah Geechee and African Diaspora Conference. 3.

External links
Coastal Carolina M.A. candidate N. Valerie McLaurin's account of researching Bolts (She is now a graduate student and teaching assistant at the University of Georgia)

1861 births
1921 deaths
Benedict College alumni
Members of the South Carolina House of Representatives